Bitolterol mesylate (Tornalate) is a short-acting β2 adrenergic receptor agonist used for the relief of bronchospasm in conditions such as asthma and COPD. In these disorders there is a  narrowing of the airways (bronchi and their ramifications) that carry air to the lungs. Muscle spasm and inflammation within the bronchi worsen this narrowing. Bitolterol relaxes the smooth muscles  present continuously around the bronchi and bronchioles facilitating the flow of air through them.

Bitolterol is a prodrug of colterol. It has a rapid onset of action (2–5 minutes) and may last up to 6–8 hours.
The drug, alone or in co-administration with theophylline, doesn't show cardiotoxic effect.

The U.S. Food and Drug Administration (FDA) approved bitolterol in December 1984. The drug was withdrawn from the market by Élan Pharmaceuticals in 2001.

References 

Beta2-adrenergic agonists
Benzoate esters
Prodrugs
Withdrawn drugs
Tert-butyl compounds
Phenylethanolamines
4-Tolyl compounds